George E. Hagen (July 1, 1878 – November 11, 1940) was a Canadian politician. He represented the electoral district of Halifax West in the Nova Scotia House of Assembly from 1933 to 1940. He was a member of the Nova Scotia Liberal Party.

Born in 1878 at Hunt's Point, Nova Scotia, Hagen was a plumbing and heating contractor by career. He married Della Dobson. He served as president of the Nova Scotia Liberal Party. Hagen entered provincial politics in the 1933 election, winning the Halifax West riding. He was re-elected in 1937. He served in the Executive Council of Nova Scotia as Minister of Industry. In July 1940, Hagen announced he was resigning from politics, but later changed his mind and was re-nominated as the Liberal candidate for Halifax West. He won the byelection on October 28 by acclamation. Hagen died in office on November 11, 1940.

References

1878 births
1940 deaths
Members of the Executive Council of Nova Scotia
Nova Scotia Liberal Party MLAs